Red Electric (formerly Drive and Red Electrick) is the name of a Maltese rock band formed in 1995. The original line-up was made up of Matthew James Borg (voice and keyboards), Peter Borg (guitars), Jonas Delicata (guitars), Ivan Borg (bass and backing vocals), and Raphael Tonna (drums).  The current line-up consist of guitarist Peter Borg, pianist Aleandro Spiteri Monsigneur, bassist Ivan Borg, singer Joe Roscoe, and drummer Robert Spiteri.

History
The band released its first single titled Shake in 1995. In 2008, the band changed its name from Drive to Red Electrick. The band has since released four albums and eight singles. Its most popular releases are Dangerous, Young Again, Everybody's Listening and Paul. 

In 2015, drummer Robert Spiteri took over from founding member and drummer Raphael Tonna. In 2018, main vocalist Matthew James Borg left the band, citing personal reasons. Singer Joe Roscoe subsequently joined the band as main vocalist. The name of the band was changed to Red Electric in 2022 and announced on social media alongside their new logo.

In summer 2022, Red Electric released a new single titled Fix of You. The song was written in 2021 and speaks about being addicted to a toxic relationship and the positive reinforcement resulting from that relationship despite the risk it poses.

Over the years, Red Electric have performed in and toured a number of cities overseas, including Austria, Copenhagen and London. The band has also signed agreements with international companies. In 2009, Red Electric signed an agreement with Poison Tree Records, a Los Angeles-based label for their music to be promoted, released, and distributed digitally worldwide. Another digital agreement was signed in 2011 with another Los Angeles-based distributor, BFM Digital, where their debut album Vine Lady was available on a number of digital stores such as Amazon, Spotify and iTunes. This deal predated the availability of iTunes in Malta.

Discography

Albums 
 Vine Lady (2010)
 The Unplugged Sessions (2012)
 Inside You (2016)
 Tragic Optimistic (2019)

Notable collaborations 
Red Electric have collaborated with multiple Maltese artists and groups. The band has released songs in collaboration with singers Joseph Calleja, Destiny, Luke Chappell, and Ira Losco, as well as the Malta Philharmonic Orchestra.

Red Electric have also collaborated with Maltese band The Travellers. The two bands created a concert series where the members of both bands perform together as a single band, with the concert setlist including songs from the discographies of both bands. The first of these concerts occurred in 2019 and was called "1", and the second in 2022 and called "ONE". Part of the proceeds from the 2022 concert were donated to the McDonald House Charities Malta which is an organization that helps families in need.

Awards and accolades 
Red Electric have won several local music awards.

References

Maltese rock music groups
Musical groups established in 1995